Hibbertia obtusifolia, commonly known as hoary guinea flower, is a species of flowering plant in the family Dilleniaceae and is endemic to south-eastern Australia. It is usually an erect shrub with spreading branches, lance-shaped to egg-shaped leaves with the narrower end towards the base, and yellow flowers with thirty or more stamens arranged around three glabrous carpels.

Description
There are thirty or more stamens arranged around three glabrous carpels. Flowering occurs from September to December.

Taxonomy
Hibbertia obtusifolia was first formally described in 1817 by Swiss botanist Augustin Pyramus de Candolle in Regni Vegetabilis Systema Naturale from specimens collected by George Caley. The specific epithet (obtusifolia) means "blunt leaved".

Distribution and habitat
Hoary guinea flower is widespread and locally common in south-east Queensland, all but the far west of New South Wales, the Australian Capital Territory and in mainly eastern Victoria, growing in forest and woodland. There is a single record from Clarke Island in Bass Strait in 1892, but recent surveys have not located the species and it is presumed extinct in that state.

Conservation status
This hibbertia is presumed extinct in Tasmania under the Tasmanian Government Threatened Species Protection Act 1995.

References

obtusifolia
Flora of New South Wales
Flora of the Australian Capital Territory
Flora of Queensland
Flora of Victoria (Australia)
Flora of Tasmania
Taxa named by Augustin Pyramus de Candolle
Plants described in 1817